Jean-Stéphane Yao Yao (born 6 October 1990 in Bouaké) is an Ivorian footballer, who currently plays as a midfielder for CSS Richard-Toll.

Career
Yao began his career with the Academie de Sefa and went to Norway in January 2009, where he signed his first professional contract with FC Lyn Oslo and made his senior debut on 18 October 2009 against Strømsgodset IF, as a substitute in the 82nd minute. He played one more game in 2009, against Odd Grenland. After FC lyn Oslo went bankrupt, Yao Yao signed for Icelandic club UMF Selfoss. On 6. April 2012 left Europe and signed for Senegalese topclub CSS Richard-Toll.

References

1990 births
Living people
Ivorian footballers
Ivorian expatriate sportspeople in Iceland
Lyn Fotball players
Eliteserien players
Ivorian expatriate footballers
Expatriate footballers in Norway
Expatriate footballers in Iceland
Selfoss men's football players
Expatriate footballers in Senegal
Ivorian expatriate sportspeople in Norway
People from Bouaké
Association football midfielders
Ivorian expatriate sportspeople in Senegal